Joseph Green (1846–1923) was a rugby union international who represented England in 1871 in the first international match.

Early life
Joseph Green was born on 28 April 1846 in West Ham. He was the second son of Frederick Green (1814–76) of the Blackwall shipbuilding family and his wife Elizabeth (née Fletcher) of Stepney (1813–70). Joseph Green was educated at Rugby and upon leaving school to join his father's firm returned to London

Rugby union career
In London, Green chose to play for West Kent Football Club alongside A. G. Guillemard. It was written that "for several years [he] was one of the most brilliant of half-backs, being an excellent field, and when once under way as speedy a runner as was ever seen with a ball under his arm, his stride being magnificent." He was selected to play for England in the first ever international match on 27 March 1871 at Edinburgh in the Scotland vs England contest. However, Green sustained a knee injury which ended his career.

Cricket
Joseph also played first-class cricket for the Marylebone Cricket Club. He had been in his school's First XI and went on to play two first-class matches in 1870. Of his cricketing skills it was written in the Rugby magazine: "Came out as a bowler at the beginning of the year, but lost precision the latter part, but with great care he may recover it; is a good hitter, but takes things a trifle too cool when at the wicket; fields remarkably well". Three of his wife's brothers played for Kent, one of whom was Frank Penn an England International, as well as two of his nephews also being first-class players (one for Kent the other for Cambridge University).

Career and personal life

Joseph married Ellen Penn, the daughter of the famous marine engineer, John Penn of Blackheath on 1 August 1877. This was in the same year that his captain in the first international rugby match, Frederick Stokes, married Ellen's sister Isabella. Thus, he and Frederick were brothers-in-law. Joseph and Ellen had three children, Ellen May (born 1879), Daisy Maud (born 1882, who married Paul Young in 1908 and had one child Ruby Ellen Young (born 1918)) and Doris(born 1887, who married Edward Longueville in 1909). 
Joseph died on 28 August 1923. Joseph's elder brother was Sir Frederick Green and it is presumed that both brothers were involved in F. Green & Co., the passenger and cargo-managing arm of the Green family enterprise. F. Green & Co. was later subsumed in the Orient Steam Navigation Co.

References

1846 births
1923 deaths
England international rugby union players
English cricketers
English rugby union players
Gentlemen of the South cricketers
Marylebone Cricket Club cricketers
Rugby union halfbacks
Rugby union players from West Ham